Gamichi (گميچي, also Romanized as Gamīchī) is a village in Jazireh Rural District, Ilkhchi District, Osku County, East Azerbaijan Province, Iran. At the 2006 census, its population was 527, in 184 families. Gamichi is a Turkic word and in Azerbaijani language it means sailor.

Gamichi is located on Shahi Island.

References 

Populated places in Osku County